Farbenfinsternis is the fourth studio album by the German dark metal band Eisregen, released through Last Episode in 2001.

Track listing
"Meine tote russische Freundin" – 3:56
"Im Reich der Fleischlichkeit" – 4:48
"Deutschland in Flammen" – 4:08
"13" – 4:22
"Dein Blut" – 7:03
"Kap. 1: Vorboten" – 5:18
"Kap. 2: Angst wird Fleisch" – 5:44
"Kap. 3: Schatten im Verstand" – 4:23
"Kap. 4: Mein Reich komme" – 4:30
"Kap. 5: Farbenfinsternis" – 4:34
"Ein Jahr im Leben des Todes" – 4:25
"Born Dead" – 2:41

Credits
 Michael "Blutkehle" Roth − vocals
 Michael "Bursche" Lenz − guitar
 Sebastian "Berg" Morbach − bass
 Theresa "2T" Trenks - violin
 Ronny "Yantit" Fimmel − drums

2001 albums
Eisregen albums